Kenyang (Nyang, Banyang, Manyang) is the most spoken  language of the Mamfe language group. It is spoken in the Manyu and Meme departments of the Southwest Region of Cameroon. Kenyang speakers in Cameroon are known as Bayangi (Bayangui) people and are called Bayangi (Bayangui).

There are three main dialects of Kenyang: Lower Kenyang, spoken in Eyumojock and  Mamfe Central subdivisions, Upper Kenyang, spoken in Upper Bayang subdivision and Kitwii, spoken in Meme department. The Upper Kenyang and Lower Kenyang dialects are more closely related to each other than to Kitwii. Variant names of Kitwii include, Kicwe, Twii, Bakoni, Northern Balong, Upper Balong and Manyeman.

Phonology and Orthography 
The phonemes of Kenyang is listed in the tables below, with their orthography written in angled brackets:

Consonant

Vowel 

All the vowels in Kenyang can be nasalized.

References

Mamfe languages
Languages of Cameroon